Azandarian (also Romanized as Azandarīān, Azandarīyān, and Azan Daryān) is a city in Jowkar District, Malayer County, Hamadan Province, Iran. At the 2006 census, its population was 8,685, in 2,126 families.

Gallery

References

Populated places in Malayer County

Cities in Hamadan Province